English runic inscription 2 (E 2, or Br E2) is a Viking Age runic inscription from the early 11th century, in a coffin of limestone in Saint Paul's Cathedral in London. The stone is in style Pr2, also known as Ringerike style. It has remains of dark blue and red colour. The stone is placed in the Museum of London.

It is possible that it was made in memory of a Viking warrior who died in service of king Canute the Great, and the creature on the stone may represent Sleipnir, Odin's eight-legged horse.

Inscription 
Latin transliteration:

: k-na : let : legia : st¶in : þensi : auk : tuki :

Old Norse transcription:

 G[i]nna(?)/G[í]na(?) lét leggja stein þenna ok Tóki.

English translation:

"Ginna(?)/Gína(?) had this stone laid and (i.e. with) Tóki."

See also
England Runestones

References

Sources 
 Barnes, Michael P. & Page, Raymond I. The Scandinavian runic inscriptions of Britain. Uppsala: Institutionen för nordiska språk - Uppsala universitet, 2006.
 Henrik Williams  2007.
 Henrik Williams: Till tolkningen av personnamnet kina 2004.

External links 
 A Viking Rune-Stone from St Paul's Churchyard, London

11th-century inscriptions
Runestones